The following is a list of Iranian mathematicians including ethnic Iranian mathematicians.

A
 Abhari (?–1262/1265)
 Abu Nasr-e Mansur (c. 960–1036)
 Abū Ja'far al-Khāzin (900–971), mathematician and astronomer
 Abu al-Wafa' Buzjani (940–998), mathematician
 Abu al-Jud (possibly died 1014/15)
 Abu al-Hasan al-Ahwazi, 10th-11th century mathematician and astronomer

B
 Bahai, Sheikh (1547–1621), poet, mathematician, astronomer, engineer, designer, faghih (religious scientist), and architect
 Abu Ma'shar al-Balkhi (787–886), known in Latin as Albumasar
 Abu Zayd al-Balkhi (850–934), geographer and mathematician
 Al-Biruni (973–1048), astronomer and mathematician
 Sahl ibn Bishr (c. 786–845?), astrologer, mathematician
 al-Birjandi (?–1528), astronomer and mathematician
 Caucher Birkar (1978- ), Kurdish-Iranian mathematician, 2018 Fields medalist

C
 Rama Cont, Professor of Mathematics at University of Oxford,  recipient of the Louis Bachelier Prize of the French Academy of Sciences (2010)

D
 Abu Hanifa Dinawari (815–896), astronomer, agriculturist, botanist, metallurgist, geographer, mathematician, and historian

E
 Abbas Edalat, Professor of Computer Science and Mathematics, Imperial College London

F
 Kamāl al-Dīn al-Fārisī (1267–1319)
 Fazari, Ibrahim (?–777), mathematician and astronomer
 Fazari, Mohammad (?–796), mathematician and astronomer

G
 Kushyar Gilani (971–1029), mathematician, geographer, astronomer
 Abu Said Gorgani (9th century), astronomer and mathematician

H
 Habash al-Hasib al-Marwazi, mathematician, astronomer, geographer
 Ayn al-Quzat Hamadani, jurisconsult, mystic, philosopher, poet and mathematician

I
 Isfahani Abol-fath (10th century)
 Al-Isfizari (11th-12th century), mathematician and astronomer

J
 Ismail_al-Jazari (12th century), polymath, mathematician, inventor
 Al-Abbās ibn Said al-Jawharī (800-860), geometer

K
 Karaji (953–1029)
 Jamshid-i Kashani (c. 1380–1429), astronomer and mathematician
 Khayyam, Omar (1048–1131), poet, mathematician, and astronomer
 Al-Kharaqī, astronomer and mathematician
 Khujandi (c. 940–c. 1000), mathematician and astronomer
 Muhammad ibn Musa al-Khwarizmi (a.k.a. Al-Khwarazmi, c. 780–c. 850), creator of algorithm and algebra, mathematician and astronomer
 Najm al-Dīn al-Qazwīnī al-Kātibī, logician and philosopher
 Abū Sahl al-Qūhī, mathematician and astronomer
 Abu Ishaq al-Kubunani (d. after 1481), mathematician, astronomer

M
 Esfandiar Maasoumi, Fellow of the Royal Statistical Society, Southern Methodist University
 Mahani (9th century), mathematician and astronomer
 Maryam Mirzakhani (1977–2017) Professor of Mathematics, Stanford University; first woman recipient of the Fields Medal (2014) 
 Muhammad Baqir Yazdi (17th century), found the pair of amicable numbers 9,363,584 and 9,437,056

N
 Nasir Khusraw (1004–1088), scientist, Ismaili scholar, mathematician, philosopher, traveler and poet
 Nasavi (c. 1010–c. 1075)
 Nizam al-Din Nishapuri, mathematician, astronomer, jurist, exegete, and poet
 Nayrizi (865–1022), mathematician and astronomer

Q
 Ali Qushji (1403 – 16 December 1474), mathematician, astronomer and physician

S
 Samarqandi, Ashraf (c. 1250–c. 1310), mathematician, astronomer
 Ibn Sahl, mathematician, physicist
 Freydoon Shahidi,  Distinguished Professor of Mathematics, Purdue University
 Sijzi (c. 945–c. 1020), mathematician, astronomer and astrologer
 Zayn al-Din Omar Savaji, philosopher and logician
 M. Vali Siadat, Distinguished Professor of Mathematics, University of Illinois at Chicago

T
 Ramin Takloo-Bighash (born 1974), number theorist, University of Illinois at Chicago
 Tusi, Nasireddin (1201–1274), Persian polymath, architect, philosopher, physician, scientist, and theologian
 Tusi, Sharafeddin (?–1213/4)

Y
 Yaʿqūb ibn Ṭāriq (?–796), mathematician and astronomer
 Nazif ibn Yumn (?–990), mathematician

Z
 Zarir Jurjani (9th century), mathematician and astronomer

References

 
Mathematicians
Iran